Joaquim Marques Esparteiro (28 January 1895 – 1976) was a Portuguese navy officer and colonial administrator.

Biography
Esparteiro was born in Abrantes on 28 January 1895. He attended the course of Naval School with a specialization in Artillery, then he graduated from University of Coimbra or University of Lisbon with a licentiate. He was also a professor of Ballistics, Calculation, Mechanics and the Artillery Specialization Course for Officers at Naval School.

On 13 November 1952, Esparteiro was appointed the Governor of Macau, replacing Albano Rodrigues de Oliveira. During his tenure, the tension between Macau and Communist China was palpable. In July 1952, a major border incident happened at Portas do Cerco with Portuguese African Troops exchanging fire with Chinese Communist border guards. According to a telegram by Esparteiro to then-Overseas Minister Sarmento Rodrigues, local Chinese businessmen like Dr. O Lon and Ma Man-kei opposed the Guangdong government's aggressive response to Portugal's possible embargo against China. He left office as governor on 8 March 1957.

In Taipa, Admiral Marques Esparteiro Road (Estrada Almirante Marques Esparteiro) was named after him.

Publications
 Arte de Marinheiro (1924, Macau); 
 Lições de Química Aplicada, Explosivos e Balística Interna (1927, Lisbon); 
 A few critical observations on Ballistic Experiments (conferência) (1933, publicada nas Transactions of Barrow-and-Furness Engineers Association); 
 Manual de Munições (publicação oficial do Ministério da Marinha (1934, London);
 Resolução de Triângulos Esféricos (1936, Lisbon); 
 Trigonometria Esférica com aplicações à Geodesia, Astronomia e Navegação (1941, Lisbon); 
 Guia de Balística Interna, de colaboração com o Primeiro-Tenente Ramalho Rosa (1942, Lisbon).

References

1895 births
1976 deaths
Governors of Macau
Portuguese colonial governors and administrators
People from Abrantes
Portuguese admirals
Portuguese writers